The Roebuck is a Grade II listed public house at 50 Great Dover Street, Southwark, London SE1 4YG.

It was rebuilt circa 1892.

An 1825 image of the previous building at the turnpike shows a sculpture of a buck on the facade.

References

External links

Grade II listed buildings in the London Borough of Southwark
Grade II listed pubs in London
Pubs in the London Borough of Southwark